is a public high school in Ueda, Nagano, Japan.

Notable alumni

Politics and government 
Takehiko Yanagida, Mayor of Komoro, Nagano
Ikuo Horigome, former House of Representatives of Japan member
Tadao Iwasaki, former House of Representatives member
Mineo Koyama, former member of the House of Councilors
Ippei Koyama, former sub-chairman of House of Councilors
Manabu Kato, current House of Representatives member

Education 
Kyoko Yamamoto, Music Director at Burlingame High School (California)

Sports 
Shogo Shiozawa, Football player, Matsumoto Yamaga FC

Education in Nagano Prefecture
Ueda, Nagano